The Boy in the Plastic Bubble is a 1976 American made for television drama film inspired by the lives of David Vetter and Ted DeVita, who lacked effective immune systems. It stars John Travolta, Glynnis O'Connor, Diana Hyland, Robert Reed, Ralph Bellamy and P.J. Soles. It was written by Douglas Day Stewart, produced by Aaron Spelling and Leonard Goldberg (who, at the time, produced Starsky and Hutch and Charlie's Angels), and directed by Randal Kleiser, who would work with Travolta again in the 1978 hit musical film adaptation of Grease shortly after. The original music score was composed by Mark Snow. The theme song "What Would They Say" was written and sung by Paul Williams. William Howard Taft High School was used for filming.

The TV movie first aired November 12, 1976 on ABC. In the United Kingdom, the TV movie was released on PAL DVD by Prism Leisure in 2001 before it finally made its terrestrial television debut on Channel 5 in 2006.

Plot
John and Mickey Lubitch conceive a child. After multiple previous miscarriages and the death of their first son (who was born without a functioning immune system), Mickey fears the likelihood that something gravely wrong could happen to their child. John assures her that the odds of their next child being born with the same condition are low.

The pregnancy results in the birth of a live baby boy, whom they name Tod. Tod's immune system also does not function properly, meaning that contact with unfiltered air may kill him. John and Mickey are told he may have to live out his entire life in incubator-like conditions. After a strenuous four years of Tod living in the hospital, Mickey convinces John to find a way to bring Tod home. He lives with his parents in Houston, Texas. He is restricted to staying in his room all his life where he eats, learns, reads, and exercises, while being protected from the outside world by various coverings.

As Tod grows, he wishes to see more of the outside world and meet regular people his age. He is enrolled at the local school after being equipped with suitable protective clothing, similar in style to a space suit. He falls in love with his next door neighbor, Gina Biggs, and he must decide between following his heart and facing near-certain death, or remaining in his protective bubble forever. 

In the end, after having a discussion with his doctor who tells him he has built up some immunities which may possibly be enough to survive the real world, he steps outside his house, unprotected, and he and Gina ride off on her horse.

Main cast
 John Travolta as Tod Lubitch
 Seth Wagerman as 3-year-old Tod
 Glynnis O'Connor as Gina Biggs
 Karri Kirsch as 3-year-old Gina
 Kimberly Kirsch as 3-year-old Gina
 Robert Reed as Johnny Lubitch
 Diana Hyland as Mickey Lubitch
 Ralph Bellamy as Dr. Gunther
 P.J. Soles as Deborah
 Kelly Ward as Tom Shuster
 Vernee Watson as Gwen
 Erna Foxworth as Neighbor
 Anne Ramsey as Rachel

Reception
David Vetter, the boy who inspired this film, questioned the film's depiction of how sterile Tod's use of the spacesuit was. Vetter scoffed at the idea that Travolta's character could simply wear the space suit back into the isolator without contaminating the bubble.

The film was nominated for four Emmy Awards, winning one posthumously for Hyland.

Impact and legacy
Days after Bill Clinton was inaugurated as U.S. President, William Safire reported on the phrase "in the bubble" as used in reference to living in the White House. Safire traced that usage in U.S. presidential politics to a passage in the 1990 political memoir What I Saw at the Revolution by Peggy Noonan, where she used it to characterize Ronald Reagan's "wistfulness about connection"; Richard Ben Cramer used the phrase two years later in What It Takes: The Way to the White House with reference to George H. W. Bush and how he had been "cosseted and cocooned in comfort by 400 people devoted to his security" and "never s[aw] one person who was not a friend or someone whose sole purpose it was to serve or protect him." Noonan's use was a reference to The Boy in the Plastic Bubble.

The film inspired Paul Simon's 1986 song "The Boy in the Bubble". In 1992, the film's premise was satirized in the seventh episode of the fourth season of Seinfeld. It was also the subject of the 2001 comedy film Bubble Boy and the 2007 musical In the Bubble produced by American Music Theatre Project and featuring a book by Rinne Groff, music by Michael Friedman and Joe Popp and lyrics by Friedman, Groff and Popp.

The film was mentioned several times on the series That '70s Show, in the episodes of NCIS "SWAK" and "Thirst", on the Family Guy episode "The Father, The Son and The Holy Fonz" and in the film Superstar.

The film had a personal impact on Travolta and Hyland, who began a six-month romantic relationship until her death, after the film ended principal photography.

In an episode of Dance Moms, Abby Lee Miller said the girls are doing a dance inspired by the movie.

The film is referenced in two episodes of The Simpsons. In the Season 10 episode "Viva Ned Flanders," as the townspeople of Springfield mock Ned Flanders for never doing anything exciting in his entire life, Carl Carlson remarks "Even the boy in the bubble had a deck of cards." During the Season 13 episode "Little Girl in the Big Ten," Bart contracts a rare illness and is confined to a giant plastic bubble (similar to a hamster ball) in order to prevent him from spreading it to others.

It was also spoofed by RiffTrax on June 28, 2010.

See also

 Bubble Boy
 Everything, Everything
 List of television films produced for American Broadcasting Company

References

External links
 
 
 
 The Boy in the Plastic Bubble, listed as "Public Domain" at Desert Island Films Pro

1976 films
1976 television films
1976 romantic drama films
ABC network original films
American romantic drama films
American drama television films
Films scored by Mark Snow
Films directed by Randal Kleiser
Films set in Houston
Films shot in Los Angeles
Films with screenplays by Douglas Day Stewart
1970s American films